The 1972–73 season was the 27th season in FK Partizan's existence. This article shows player statistics and matches that the club played during the 1972–73 season.

Friendlies

Competitions

Yugoslav First League

Matches

See also
 List of FK Partizan seasons

References

External links
 Official website
 Partizanopedia 1972-73  (in Serbian)

FK Partizan seasons
Partizan